A number of vessels of the People's Liberation Army Navy have borne the name Hefei, after the capital Hefei.

 , a Type 051Z destroyer. In service from 1980 until 2013.
 , a Type 052D destroyer, in service since 2015.

References 

People's Liberation Army Navy ship names